Following is a list of Mexican architects.

A–M

 Alberto Arai (1915–1959)
 Angélica Araujo Lara (born 1964)
 Luis Barragán (1902–1988)
 Juan Carlos Baumgartner (born 1972)
 Tatiana Bilbao (born 1972)
 Gerardo Broissin (born 1975)
 Fernanda Canales (born 1974)
 Pedro Castellanos (c. 1902–1961)
 Laura Itzel Castillo (born 1957)
 Clara de Buen Richkarday (born 1954)
 Francisco Antonio de Guerrero y Torres (c. 1727–c. 1792)
 Bernardo Gómez-Pimienta (born 1961)
 Fernando González Gortázar (1942–2022)
 Agustín Hernández Navarro (1924–2022)
 Alberto Kalach (born 1960)
 Ricardo Legorreta (1931–2011)
 Ruth Rivera Marin (1927–1969)
 Guillermo Moreno (born 1955)
 Javier Senosiain (born 1948)
 Agustín Landa Verdugo (c. 1923–2009)

N–Z

 Enrique Norten (born c. 1954)
 Juan O'Gorman (1905–1982)
 Beatriz Peschard (born 1970)
 Eugenio Peschard (1914–1977)
 Clara Porset (1895–1981)
 Ruth Rivera Marín (1927–1969)
 Fernando Romero (born 1971)
 Mauricio Rocha (born 1963)
 Manuel Rocha Diaz (1936–1996)
 Mario Schjetnan Garduño (born 1945)
 Teresa Táboas (born 1961)
 Sara Topelson de Grinberg (born 1945)
 Alfonso Valenzuela-Aguilera (born 1964)
 Pedro Ramirez Vazquez (1919–2013)
 Abraham Zabludovsky (1924–2003)

See also

 Architecture of Mexico
 List of architects
 List of Mexicans

References

Mexican
Architects